Arshad Pasha al-Umari (8 April 1888 – 5 August 1978) was an Iraqi statesman from the ancient al-Omari family.

Youth

Arshad al-Umari was born in Mosul, Iraq on 8 April 1888 when his father was Mayor of Mosul. He obtained his high school degree in 1904 when he was 16 years old. After finishing high school at Mosul he left for Istanbul, the capital of the Ottoman Empire, to complete his studies. He did the trip by horses via Aleppo to the port of Alexandretta on the Mediterranean Sea. Such a trip in those days took about 40 days. From Alexandretta he took the steamer to Istanbul where he was admitted to the Architectural Division of the Royal Engineering College. The teaching staff of the college were professors from Germany, Belgium and Austria.

He graduated as an architect in 1908, when he was 21 years old, and was appointed in the Architectural Division of the Municipality of Istanbul. When World War I broke out in 1914 he was conscripted as an engineer in the Ministry of Defense and when the war was over in 1918 he returned to the Municipality of Istanbul as Chief Engineer when Cemil Topuzlu was Lord Mayor of Istanbul. He married Rafi'a Khanim, the younger sister of Jamil Pasha the Lord Mayor of Istanbul. Jamil Pasha and Rafi'a Khanim's father was Dhia Pasha who occupied several prominent positions in the Ottoman Empire, the most important of which was the personal supervision of the renovation of the Dome of the Rock in Jerusalem, ordered by the Sultan Abdul Hamid II. He lived with his family several years in Jerusalem to carry out this job.

After World War I when the Arab countries including Iraq were separated from the Ottoman Empire, al-Umari returned from Istanbul to Mosul, in 1919, with his wife, where he was appointed chief engineer of the Municipality of Mosul and continued until 1924. During this period his four children, Suad, Frozan (Suzy), Issam and Imad were born in Mosul.

Political career

In 1924, he was elected a member of the first Parliament of Iraq after the formation of the national government of Iraq under King Faisal I. From 1925 through 1931 he was Director General of Post and Telegraph, and from 1931 to 1933 Lord Mayor of Baghdad.

On the formation of the Red Crescent he was elected President of the society and continued holding that position until 1958, more than 25 years.

In 1933, he was Director General of Irrigation, and from 1934 to 1935 he was Minister of Public Works. In 1935, he was Director General of Municipalities. From 1936 till 1944, he was Lord Mayor of Baghdad for a second time. The city planning and the general layout of the present modern Baghdad were one of his great achievements of the period. From 4 June 1944 to 25 August 1945, he was Minister of Foreign Affairs and Deputy Minister of Defense and Supply. During his Ministership of Foreign Affairs, diplomatic relations were established with the USSR and letters were exchanged between him and Vyacheslav Molotov on 11 September 1944. Also during his Ministership, the Arab League was formed and he headed the Iraqi delegations to Cairo, Egypt, and signed the Charter of the Arab League on 22 March 1945.

al-Umari headed the Iraqi delegation to sign the United Nations charter at San Francisco, California. On the arrival of the delegation to New York, President Franklin Roosevelt died on 12 April 1945. al-Umari headed the Iraqi delegation at the funeral on 14 April 1945.

On 26 April, the San Francisco Conference consisting of 50 nations met to discuss the draft of the United Nations Organization. al-Umari, the head of the Iraqi delegation, in protest against the apparent intention of the great powers to partition the British Mandate of Palestine into a Jewish State and an Arab State, refused to sign the charter and left the conference returning to Iraq on June 13, 1945. On June 26 the Charter was signed. Dr. Fadhil Al-Jamali signed on behalf of Iraq.

After his return to Iraq, al-Umari resigned from the cabinet as Minister of Foreign Affairs on 25 August 1945. From 4 June to 14 December 1946 he was Prime Minister of Iraq for the first time.

From 29 January to 23 June 1948 he was Minister of Defense. In 1952 he was selected to be the Executive Vice-President of the Development Board. The Development Board was formed to undertake the study and execution of major construction schemes such as the Darbandikhan Dam on the Diyala River, the Dukan Dam on the Little Zab, the Bekhme Dam on the Great Zab, the Samarra Dam on the Tigris and the Lake Tharthar flood protection scheme connected with it, the Mosul Dam on the Tigris, the network of modern highways connecting major cities in Iraq, a great number of hospitals, schools and other public institutions.

In April 1954, he became Prime Minister of Iraq for the second time. In 1958, at the age of 70, he retired to his favorite city of Istanbul. He returned to Iraq in 1968 and spent the rest of his life at the Baghdad residence of his elder son, Dr. Issam ul-Umari. He died in Baghdad on 5 August 1978 at the age of 90 and was buried at the family cemetery in Mosul.

Sources
 Harris M. Lentz III, Heads of States and Governments: A Worldwide Encyclopedia of Over 2,300 Leaders, 1945 through 1992. McFarland & Company, Inc., 1994, p. 411. .

1888 births
1978 deaths
Iraqi Muslims
Arabs from the Ottoman Empire
Prime Ministers of Iraq
People from Mosul
A